The Girdler sulfide (GS) process, also known as the GeibSpevack (GS) process, is an industrial production method for filtering out of natural water the heavy water (deuterium oxide = D2O) which is used in particle research, in deuterium NMR spectroscopy, deuterated solvents for proton NMR spectroscopy, in heavy water nuclear reactors (as a coolant and moderator) and in deuterated drugs.

Karl-Hermann Geib and Jerome S. Spevack independently, and in parallel, invented the process in 1943 and its name derives from the Girdler company, which built the first American plant using the process.

The method is an isotopic exchange process between H2S and H2O ("light" water), that produces heavy water over several steps. It is a highly energy intensive process.

Until its closure in 1997, the Bruce Heavy Water Plant in Ontario (located on the same site as Douglas Point and the Bruce Nuclear Generating Station) was the world's largest heavy water production plant, with a peak capacity of 1600 tonnes per year (800 tonnes per year per full plant, two fully operational plants at its peak). It used the Girdler sulfide process to produce heavy water, and required by mass 340000 units of feed water to produce 1 unit of heavy water.

The first such facility of India's Heavy Water Board to use the Girdler process is at Rawatbhata near Kota, Rajasthan. This was followed by a larger plant at Manuguru, Andhra Pradesh. Other plants exist in the United States and Romania for example. Romania, India and the former supplier of much of the world's heavy water demand Canada all have operating heavy water reactors with two at Cernavoda Nuclear Power Plant in Romania making up the country's entire fleet and several each in India (mostly IPHWR) and Canada (exclusively CANDU).

The Process 
Each of a number of steps consists of two sieve tray columns. The enrichment process is based on the difference in separation between 30°C and 130°C.

The process of interest is the equilibrium reaction,

{| width="450"
|  style="width:50%; height:30px;"| H2O + HDS  HDO + H2S
|}

At 30°C, the equilibrium constant K = 2.33, while at 130°C, K = 1.82. This difference is exploited for enriching deuterium in heavy water.

Hydrogen sulfide gas is circulated in a closed loop between the cold tower and the hot tower (although these can be separate towers, they can also be separate sections of one tower, with the cold section at the top).  Demineralised and deaerated water is fed to the cold tower where deuterium migration preferentially takes place from the hydrogen sulfide gas to the liquid water.  Normal water is fed to the hot tower where deuterium transfer takes place from the liquid water to the hydrogen sulfide gas. In cascade systems, the same water is used for both inputs. The mechanism for this is the difference in the equilibrium constant; in the cold tower, deuterium concentration in the hydrogen sulfide is lowered, and the concentration in the water raised. The deuterium in the hot loop slightly prefers to be in the hydrogen sulfide, resulting in excess deuterium in the hydrogen sulfide relative to the cold tower. For n moles of deuterium per mole of protium in the hot tower input water, there is  moles per mole of deuterium in the hydrogen sulfide. In the cold tower, part of this deuterium is transferred to the cold tower input water, in accordance with the equilibrium constant. At the input to the cold tower, the ratio of products to reactants in the above equation is 1.82, since both input streams have equal concentrations of deuterium. The chemical equilibrium tries to force more deuterium into the water to correct the ratio. Ideally, the cold tower should output water with 28% more deuterium than it entered (2.33 divided by 1.82). Enriched water is output from the cold tower, while depleted water is output from the hot tower. 

An appropriate cascade system accomplishes enrichment: enriched water is fed into another separation unit and is further enriched.  

Normally in this process, water is enriched to 1520% D2O.  Further enrichment to "reactor-grade" heavy water (> 99% D2O) is done in another process, e.g. distillation.

See also 
 Heavy water

References 

Industrial processes
Isotope separation
Name reactions
German inventions of the Nazi period
American inventions